The 2019 U23 Senior Asian Wrestling Championship was the 1st edition of Asian U23 Wrestling Championships of combined events, and took place from March 21 to 24 in Ulaanbaatar, Mongolia.

Medal table

Team ranking

Medal summary

Men's freestyle

Men's Greco-Roman

Women's freestyle

Participating nations

References

External links 
 Database
 Results book

Asian Wrestling U23 Championships
Asian Wrestling U23 Championships
International wrestling competitions hosted by Mongolia
Sport in Ulaanbaatar
Asian U23 Wrestling Championship